The women's 500 m time trial competition at the 2010 Asian Games was held on 13 November at the Guangzhou Velodrome.

Schedule
All times are China Standard Time (UTC+08:00)

Records

Results

References

External links 
Results

Track Women Time trial